Qarwa K'uchu  (Quechua qarwa pale, yellowish, golden, k'uchu corner, "yellowish corner", Hispanicized spelling Carhuacucho) is a mountain in the Wansu mountain range in the Andes of Peru, about  high. It is situated in the Arequipa Region, La Unión Province, Pampamarca District. Qarwa K'uchu lies northwest of Kimsa Qaqa.

References 

Mountains of Peru
Mountains of Arequipa Region